After the Occupation of Korea and the March 1st Movement, the Korean Provisional Government coordinated and operated Korean Military and the Irregular army groups as militarized associations of resistance groups both outside and within Korean and Chinese borders (mostly Manchuria) until roughly World War II (1939–1945).

During the Korean Independence Movement the resistance forces functioned as a big-tent political movement representing an array of political opinions in Korea and China united in their opposition to Japan from Democracy, to Socialism, to Communism, and to Anarchism.

Following the Massacre of Svobodny, the resistance groups were dissolved or broken off from the Provisional Government of the Republic of Korea to continue their liberation campaign but also dissolved in the mid-30s. However, the provisional government established the Korean Liberation Army, on September 17, 1940, in Chungking, China, by uniting the remnants of the guerilla fighters into their armed forces.

Background

Late Joseon dynasty period Korean nationalism outgrew the unplanned, spontaneous, and disorganized Donghak movement, and became more violent as Japanese colonizers began a brutal regime throughout the Korean peninsula and pursued repressive policies against the Korean people. For at least thirteen years after 1905, small irregular forces, often led by regular army commanders, fought skirmishes and battles throughout Korea against Japanese police, armies, and underworld mercenaries who functioned to support Japanese corporations in Korea, and as well-armed Japanese settlers who seized Korean farms and land. In one period, according to Japanese records in Boto Tobatsu-shi (Annals of the Subjugation of the Insurgent), between October 1907 and April 1908, over 1,908 attacks were made by the Korean people against the invaders.

The Righteous Army was formed by Yu In-seok and other Confucian scholars during the Peasant Wars. Its ranks swelled after the Queen's murder by the ronin. Under the leadership of Min Jeong-sik, Choe Ik-hyeon and Shin Dol-seok, the Righteous Army attacked the Japanese army, Japanese merchants and pro-Japanese bureaucrats in the provinces of Gangwon, Chungcheong, Jeolla and Gyeongsang.

Choe Ik-hyeon was captured by the Japanese and taken to Tsushima Island where he went on hunger strike and finally died in 1906. Shin Dol-seok, an uneducated peasant commanded over 3,000 troops. Among the troops were former government soldiers, poor peasants, fishermen, tiger hunters, miners, merchants, and laborers.

The Korean army was disbanded on August 1, 1907. The Army was led by 1st Battalion Commander Major Park Seung-hwan, who later committed suicide, occurred after the disbandment, led by former soldiers of the Korean Army against Japan in Namdaemun Gate. The disbanded army joined the Righteous Armies and together they solidified a foundation for the Righteous Armies battle.

In 1907, the Righteous Army under the command of Yi In-yeong massed 10,000 troops to liberate Seoul and defeat the Japanese. The Army came within 12 km of Seoul but could not withstand the Japanese counter-offensive. The Righteous Army was no match for two infantry divisions of 20,000 Japanese soldiers backed by warships moored near Incheon.

The Righteous Army retreated from Seoul and the war went on for two more years. Over 17,000 Righteous Army soldiers were killed and more than 37,000 were wounded in combat. Unable to fight the Japanese army head-on, the Righteous Army split into small bands of partisans to carry on the War of Liberation in China, Siberia, and the Baekdu Mountains in Korea. The Japanese troops first quashed the Peasant Army and then disbanded the remained of the government army. Many of the surviving guerrilla and anti-Japanese government troops fled to Manchuria and Primorsky Krai to carry on their fight. In 1910, Japan annexed Korea and starting the period of Japanese rule.

History
The March 1st Movement provided a catalyst for the Korean Independence Movement, which was crucial to the spread of Korea's independence movement to other local governments, including Hoengseong. Given the ensuing suppression and hunting down of activists by the Japanese, many Korean leaders went into exile in Manchuria, Shanghai and other parts of China, where they continued their activities.  The Movement was a catalyst for the establishment of the Provisional Government of the Republic of Korea in Shanghai in April 1919.

They coordinated armed resistance such as the Northern Military Administration Office, the Korean Independence Army, and the Korean Patriotic Organization against the Imperial Japanese Army during the 1920s and 1930s, including at the Battle of Bongoh Town in June 1920 and the Battle of Chingshanli in October 1920. However, ther manpower diminished when they attempted to reorganize their forces in Svobodny, Amur Oblast, Russia. The Bolsheviks believed them to be a liability to the Soviet Union during the Russian Civil War when the Japanese joined forces with the White Army and forced them disarm and join the Red Army. But they refused and the Red Army massacred them at Svobodny. Still, despite these losses, they hugely struck a blow to the Japanese military leadership in Shanghai's Hongkew Park, April 1932.

This struggle culminated in the formation of the Korean Volunteer Corps in 1938, the Joseon Volunteer Army, and the Korean Liberation Army in 1940, bringing together all Korean resistance groups in exile.

Military Units of the 1920s

Korean Independence Army

In August 1918, when Japan invaded Primorsky in support of the White Army during the Russian civil war, Hong Beom-do formed a military force, Korea Independence Army centered around the former independence army and Korean people living in Manchuria. When the March 1st Movement took place in 1919, Hong and his soldiers moved to Antuhyun. In 1919, Hong Beom-do (1868 ~ 1943) created relations with Koreans residing in Yeonggae, Primorsky Krai, and Gando (Jiandao). 

Later, in August 1919, the army crossed the Yalu River and wiped out a Japanese military unit. This was the first domestic military operation to take place in Korea following the March 1st Movement. In October, Hong's forces once again moved into Korea, occupied Ganggye and Manpojin, fighting a fierce battle with the Japanese army in Jaseong county, northern Korea. However, due to difficulties in supplying his weapons and logistics, in the winter of 1919, he went under the Korean National Association in Gando and received financial support. The number of soldiers increased to 600, and combat power was strengthened by equipping 600 military guns, about 30 pistols, and about 200 rounds of ammunition per gun.

By March 1920, Hong was allied with the Eastern Ministry of Military Service, led by Choi Jin-dong, who had been stationed in Hoeryong and Jongseong (Wongseong) along the Tuman coast of the Tuman River. The domestic resistance operation of the Korean independence forces provided a boost to the national spirit of Koreans everywhere and prompted further armed resistance struggles in Manchuria. 2,000 Korean independence fighters in the Jilin area attacked the camp of the Japanese army at night, killing 300 people and routing 400 while developing an independence movement while maintaining organic contact with Choi Jin-dong's Military Martial Independence Army and others.

By March 1920, the army had moved its base from Antuhyun to Fengwudong, Wang Qinghyun, China and received financial support from the Korean People's Association for a larger domestic resistance operation. Hong also joined forces with the National Liberation Army, which was under the leadership of the Korean People's Association. The military's finances and administration were managed by the Korean Minjok Association and the Korean Independence Army was directed by Hong Beom-do. Around 200 old righteous soldiers and old farmers and laborers from Gando, centering on Hongbeom-do, purchased weapons from various places to train the independence army.

In the Battle of Baegunpyeong on the 21st of October, the Battle of Wanlugu, Battle of Cheonsupyung, Battle of Eorangchon on the 22nd, and the Battle of Cheonbosan on the 24th, the enemy lost 1,254 dead and over 2,000 wounded. Among them, the 1st Regiment under Hong Beom-do killed 1,200 enemy soldiers. After that, in fear of retaliation from the Japanese Empire, 600 members of the Korean Independence Army moved to Noryeong under the command of Commander Hong Beom-do and joined the Korean Independence Corps.

Korean Independence Corps

At the request of the Chinese side, which could not overcome the pressure of Japan, the independence army units located in all parts of South and North Manchuria, especially in North Gando, moved to the direction of Milsan near the Sino-Soviet border to build a new anti-Japanese war base.
In December 1920, under the leadership of the Bukrogunjeongseo, the Korean Independence Army, the Korean New People's Association, the Korean National Association headed by Gu Chun-seon, and the Korean National Association in Honchun, the Military Provincial Government Department, Representatives of the Uigunbu, Hyolseongdan, Yadan, and Daehanjeonguigunjeongsa crossed over to the Maritime Province of Noryeong to wage a long-term anti-Japanese war. Decided to prepare, he organized this group in Milsan, the Korea Independence Corps. 

Seo Il (徐一) as president, Hong Beom-do (洪範圖) as vice president, Baek Soon (白純 and Kim Ho-ik) as advisors, Choi Jin-dong (崔振東) as foreign minister, Kim Jwa-jin (金佐鎭) as chief of staff, staff Lee Jang-nyeong and Na Joong-so as military advisers, Ji Cheong-cheon as military advisor, Kim Gyu-sik as the 1st Brigade Commander, Park Yeong-hee as the Staff, Anmu as the 2nd Brigade Commander, and Staff Lee Dan-seung (李檀承), 2nd Brigade Cavalry Commander Kang Phillip, company commanders Kim Chang-hwan, Oh Gwang-seon (吳光鮮), and Jo Dong-shik (趙東植) were appointed. There was a brigade as an upper unit under the corps, and under it, 3 battalions, 9 companies, and 27 platoons were organized, and the total strength was about 3,500.

In the process of moving to Free City, the units that did not respond to disarmament returned to Manchuria from Iman, Primorsky Krai (now Dalnerechensk Province, Primorsky Krai, Russia). Units that moved to Free City suffered the Heihe Incident (Yiqing) in the process of integration. After the Heihe Incident, the remaining troops in Free City were reorganized into the Koryo Revolutionary Army. Afterwards, the Koryo Revolutionary Army moved to Irkutsk.

Efforts to create an independent corps by integrating the units of the Anti-Japanese Independence Army continued. As part of these efforts, a preparatory meeting for the military federation was organized in September 1924. Lee Beom-yoon (李範允) was appointed as the president and Kim Jwa-jin was appointed as the commander-in-chief. Kim Gyu-sik, Choi Jin-dong, Hyeon Cheon-muk, Kang Guk-mo, Nam Sung-geuk, Choi Ho, Park Doo-hee, Yoo Hyeon, Lee Jang-nyeong, etc. was active Centering on Dongnyeong County in Manchuria, it expanded its influence along the Dongji line connecting Subunhe to Harbin.

However, at this time, several units of the Independence Army were officially integrated into a single Independence Corps, but in reality, complete integration was not achieved due to poor finances and dispersal of forces.

Heroic Corps

The Heroic Corps was an organization founded in Korea in 1919, during the Japanese colonial period. Its activists believed in revolutionary uprising as well as egalitarianism.

After the March 1st Movement was crushed in 1919, many independence activists moved their bases to foreign countries. However, members of the Heroic Corps thought that those organizations were too moderate and would not contribute to independence in Korea, and instead took a more radical approach by opposing compromising solutions such as culturalism. The Heroic Corps wished for a violent revolution, reflected by the Manifesto of the Korean Revolution by independence activist Shin Chae-ho. The Corps struggled for independence by assassinating high-ranking Japanese officials and committing acts of terrorism against government offices. The Heroic Corps moved their base to Beijing, China and brought members to Shanghai where they had about 70 members in 1924. Kim Gu, Kim Kyu-sik, Kim Chang-suk, and Shin Chae-ho were engaged as advisers and Chiang Kai-shek, President of the Republic of China, supported the Heroic Corps. However, as time passed, their movement evolved with the spirit of the times.

Military Administration Offices and Commands

Military Provincial Administration
It is also called Dodokbu and Dokgunbu. It was organized in 1919 by Choi Jin-dong in Bongui-dong, Wangqing County, Manchuria. At the time of formation, there were about 600 troops, and they were organized with Park Young as chief of staff, Lee Chun-seung as battalion commander, Dong-chun Lee as company commander, and Choi Moon-in as platoon commander.
This organization, in alliance with Hong Beom-do's Korean Independence Army, developed an active domestic entry operation. In 1920, Anmu's National Association Army and Hong Beom-do's Korean Independence Army formed the Allied Command, and the total military strength exceeded 1,000. From the spring of 1920, this combined unit mainly attacked the Japanese army in Hamgyeongbuk-do, along the Tumen River, and achieved great results.

Organization
Looking at the organization of the combined units, Commander Choi Jin-dong, Adjutant Choreography, Regimental Commander Hong Beom-do, 1st Company Commander Lee Chun-oh, 2nd Company Commander Kang Sang-mo, 3rd Company Commander Kang Si-beom, 4th Company Commander Jo Kwon-sik was the right).

Dissolution
After the Battle of Cheongsan-ri in October 1920, Choi Jin-dong's unit, which crossed over to Primonsky Krai, and suffered a cataclysmic disaster due to the betrayal of the Soviet Army.

Northern Military Administration Office

In October 1919, under the leadership of Daejonggyo and Shinminhoe, Daehan Jeonguidan and Daehangunjeonghoe were merged and reorganized into Daehangunjeongbu. In December of that year, the Provisional Government in Shanghai agreed on the condition that the name be changed to Northern Military Administration Office.

The officers at the time of the reorganization of the Northern Military Administration Office were President Seo Il, Commander-in-Chief Kim Jwa-jin, Chief of Staff Lee Jang-nyeong, Division Commander Kim Gyu-shik, Brigade Commander Choi Hae, Regimental Commander Jeong Hoon, Yeonseong Captain Lee Beom-seok. They included accountant Gyehwa, Jilin branch office adviser Yoon Bokyeong (尹復榮), and military discipline supervisor Yang Hyeon (梁玄).

Training
The Northern Military Administration Office set up the base in the forest area of ​​about 30 acres in the area of ​​Seodaepasimnipyeong in Wangqing County and built 8 barracks to establish a military academy. They requested help from Shinheung Military Academy, and was supplied with various teaching materials and a number of officers including Kim Chwa-chin and younger instructors Lee Beom-seok, Lee Jang-nyeong, Kim Gyu-sik, Kim Hong-guk, Choi Sang-un, and Oh Sang-se, citizens and young people coming from home were selected and full-scale military training was conducted.

In the 6-month accelerated course, subjects such as mental education, history, military science, arts, gymnastics, and rules and regulations were set as subjects, and military training was conducted based on the old Korean military style. . In June 1920, out of 600 men who completed basic training, only 300 went into full-scale military training wearing gray military uniforms.

In addition to military training, Gunjeongseo not only cooperated with independent movement organizations in Noryeong and Gando, but also served as a contact center for independence activists in northern Manchuria. While paying attention to local administration, elementary schools, night schools, and training centers were established, while promoting convenience in local industries.

Organization
The armies under the office were organized into battalions. One platoon was composed of 50 people, two platoons were organized into one company, and two companies were organized into one battalion. The size of the troops was 500 in the early days, but in August 1920, it exceeded 1,600, and it became the strongest elite unit in Northeast Manchuria armed with 1,300 rifles, 150 pistols, and 7 machine guns. Operating funds were covered by local residents or collected from domestic sources. The funds were mainly used to purchase weapons, and the personal equipment per person in the independence army was 1 rifle, 500 bullets, 1 grenade, 6 sets of emergency food, and 1 pair of sandals.

Korean Northern Army Command
On May 3, 1920, at the request of the National Assembly, the National Association Armed Forces and the Military Administrative Department were allied to establish the Korean Northern Army Command (Daehanbukrodoggunbu.

The base was located in Fengwudong, Wangqing County. The Korea Military Association held a joint military operation with other Korean military and resistance forces in Wangchunhyeon Poomdong. Also located there were the Provisional Ministry of Education, the Ministry of Military Affairs, and the Korean Civil Corps. The northern Korean military group orchestrated many of the subsequent activities, specifically being in charge of administration, politics, and finances. The base was commanded by Commander Choi Jin-dong, Adjutant Officer Ahn Mu, Bukro 1st Army Headquarters and Military Commander Hong Beom-do became the head of the Korean Northern Army Command and was in charge of the military forces. The Korean rebels were assembled into four companies under the leadership of Yi Cheon-oh, Kang Sang-mo, Kang Si-beom, and Jo Kwon-dong. The 700 combined corps of Lee Won's Unit won a great victory from June 4th to 7th, 1920 in the Battle of Samdunja and the Battle of Bongo-dong, inflicting 157 enemy casualties, 120 seriously injured, and 100 lightly wounded.

On June 4, 1920, the army, which was led by Park Seung-gil, entered Jaseong County, Korea and ambushed Samdungja and attacked a Japanese army patrol. In retaliation, the Japanese army occupied Nanam-dong (now Cheongjin) in North Hamgyeong-do of the Japanese 19th Division headquarter base. By June 7, the Daehan Independence Army, National Association Army, Doron Ministry of Military, and the Shinmin Corps had defeated the battalion of 19th Division of the Japanese Army in Bong-o-dong and won the great victory. On July 8, Hong and his forces surprised and defeated the Japanese police who were searching for the independence forces in that area.

Eastern Military Administration Office
On July 20th, North Gando Independence Army groups were integrated into the Eastern Military Administration Office (Dongdogunjeongseo, centered on the Northern Military Administration Office, and the Eastern Ministry of Military Office (Dongdodoggunbu, centered on the Korean Independence Army.

Organization
This office consisted of 1,600 soldiers of the Bukrogunjeongseo Army with Kim Jwa-jin as the commander, and Hong Beomdo as the commander of the Dongdogunjeongseo, and the combined forces of the Korean Independence Army, National Association Army, Dodokbu Army, Uigundan Army, and Sinmindan Army consisted of 1,600 soldiers.

On October 6, 15,000 soldiers of the 19th and 20th divisions under the Japanese Government-General of Korea dispatched troops to Gando, and on the 20th of this month, the North Gando Independence Army was reorganized again. The army under this office was organized into a regiment with Hong Beom-do leading them. The regiment consisted of the Korean Independence Army (300 soldiers), National Association Army (250 soldiers), Uigundan Army (250 soldiers), Hanminhoe Army (200 soldiers), Uimindangun (100 soldiers), Sinmindangun (100 soldiers), Gwangbokdangun ( 200), 2nd Regimental Commander Kim Jwa-jin had 1,600 people from Bukrogunjeongseo-gun, and 3rd Regimental Commander Choi Jin-dong had 600 people from the Military Martial Arts Department.

Military Units of the 1930s

Korea Independence Army (Korea Independence Party)
The Korean Independence Party was established in Shanghai by Kim Koo in 1928, uniting a faction of conservative members of the Provisional Government of the Republic of Korea headed by Kim.

Korean Patriotic Legion 

On September 18, 1931, the Empire of Japan staged the Liutiaohu incident (bombing of the Manchu railroad) and Mukden Incident. The Chinese people's anti-Japanese fervor proliferated because of these incidents. To promote Korea–China relations and to revitalize the depressed independence movement, the Provisional Government of the Republic of Korea founded a secret organization which would carry out covert missions to assassinate key Japanese figures. That task was entrusted to Kim Gu.

Kim Gu organized the Korean Patriotic Organization with about 80 members, mostly patriotic Korean youngsters. The organization was based in Shanghai, China. Leaders included Kim Suk, Ahn Gong-geun, Lee Su-bong, and Lee Yu-pil; other notable members were Yoo Sang-geun, Yoo Jin-man, Yun Bong-gil, Lee Bong-chang, Lee Duk-ju, and Choi Heung-sik. The Provisional Government of the Republic of Korea hope to shock and halt Japan's aggression with assassinations.

The Korean Patriotic Organization has been identified as being responsible for the assassination attempts. Following this, Japanese police authorities rushed to arrest key figures of the Provisional Government of the Republic of Korea by threatening the Shanghai French Concession. Many Korean activists sought refuge in Hangzhou and Jiaxing, through not all made it; among those arrested was Ahn Changho. The Provisional Government of the Republic of Korea eventually relocated to Hangzhou. Later it moved to Zhenjiang in 1935, and Nanjing in 1936. During that time, the activities of the Korean Patriotic Organization diminished.

Expatriate military groups
Expatriate military liberation groups were active in Shanghai, northeast China, parts of Russia, Hawaii, San Francisco, and Los Angeles. Groups were even organised in areas without many expatriate Koreans, such as the one established in 1906 in Colorado by Park Hee Byung. The culmination of expatriate success was the Shanghai declaration of independence.

Korean National Army Corps

Korean National Army Corps, founded in June 1914. (Hawaii) 

Sun Yat-sen was an early supporter of Korean struggles against Japanese invaders. By 1925, Korean expatriates began to cultivate two-pronged support in Shanghai: from Chiang Kai-Shek's Kuomintang, and from early communist supporters, who later branched into the Chinese Communist Party.

Little real support came through, but that which did develop long-standing relationships that contributed to the dividing of Korea after 1949, and the polar positions between south and north.

References

Armies in exile during World War II
Kim Won-bong
Korean independence movement
National liberation armies
Provisional Government of the Republic of Korea
Kuomintang
China–South Korea military relations
Military history of Korea
Disbanded armed forces
Military units and formations established in 1920
Military units and formations established in 1937
Military units and formations disestablished in 1940